Solčany is a municipality in the Topoľčany District of the Nitra Region, Slovakia. Solčany Village is the center of the municipality. In 2011 it had 2467 inhabitants. It has good shopping networks, small health centers, sport clubs and sport facilities. Solčany is also the birthplace of known footballers, Anton Ondruš and Anton Švajlen.

Notable people
 Anton Ondruš, footballer
 Anton Švajlen, footballer

References

External links
http://en.e-obce.sk/obec/solcany/solcany.html
Official homepage

Villages and municipalities in Topoľčany District